The Captain's Table is a 1954 comedy novel by the British writer Richard Gordon. The captain of a rundown cargo ship is transferred by the company to command a luxury liner.

Adaptations
In 1959 it was made into a British film of the same title directed by Jack Lee and starring John Gregson and Donald Sinden. A West German adaptation The Captain was produced in 1971 
starring Heinz Rühmann and
Johanna Matz.

References

Bibliography
 Goble, Alan. The Complete Index to Literary Sources in Film. Walter de Gruyter, 1999.

1954 British novels
Novels by Richard Gordon
British comedy novels
British novels adapted into films
Michael Joseph books